Joseph Malcewicz (March 17, 1897 – April 20, 1962) was an American professional wrestler and a promoter, best known for his nickname "The Utica Panther". He is an overall three-time world champion under different incarnations and recognitions.

Malcewicz is acknowledged for his contributions to professional wrestling in San Francisco, during his time as a promoter of NWA San Francisco. Malcewicz is a charter member of the Professional Wrestling Hall of Fame.

Early life 
Malcewicz was born to Polish immigrants, being the oldest of five children. While being a teenager, Malcewicz played football at Utica Free Academy and for the Utica Knights of Columbus.

Professional wrestling career 
Malcewicz began his training with Farmer Burns and Herbert Hartley, before entering the professional wrestling ranks in 1913. Malcewicz earliest recorded match was against Charles Uberle on February 2, 1914, which ended in a draw. On 1917, during the World War I, Malcewicz was drafted to the military when he served at Camp Jackson, reaching to the level of sergeant upon his return to wrestling. On 1926, Malcewicz was a last-minute challenger for Joe Stecher's World Heavyweight Wrestling Championship. When Stecher left the match as a sign of protest, Malcewicz was named as the title holder, however, was never awarded the championship itself.

As a promoter, Malcewicz managed to promote wrestling at San Francisco, while running NWA San Francisco. On November 1935, Malcewicz replaced Jack Ganson as the leaseholder of New Dreamland Auditorium, after buying Ganson's interest for $15,000 after Paul Bowser and Toots Mondt convinced him to step aside. Malcewicz held is first show on November 26, 1935. On November 26, 1949, Malcewicz joined the newly-formed National Wrestling Alliance (NWA). During his time with NWA, Malcewicz created the NWA World Tag Team Championship (San Francisco version) and the second regional NWA World Tag Team Championship.

On April 20, 1962, Malcewicz died after he suffered a fatal Heart attack.

Championships and accomplishments 
 Professional Wrestling Hall of Fame
 Class of 2015

References 

1897 births
1962 deaths
American male professional wrestlers
Professional Wrestling Hall of Fame and Museum